Zhang Lixia (born January 25, 1977, in Gansu) is a female Chinese softball player. She competed at the 2004 Summer Olympics.

In the 2004 Olympic softball competition, she finished fourth with the Chinese team. She played a total of three matches as pitcher.

External links
profile

1977 births
Living people
Chinese softball players
Olympic softball players of China
Sportspeople from Gansu
Softball players at the 2004 Summer Olympics
Asian Games medalists in softball
Softball players at the 2002 Asian Games
Medalists at the 2002 Asian Games
Asian Games silver medalists for China